Mansureh, in Iran, may refer to:
 Mansureh-ye Kanin
 Mansureh-ye Mazi
 Mansureh-ye Olya
 Mansureh-ye Sadat